Pressure charger  may refer to:

 Exhaust pulse pressure charging
 Supercharger
 Turbocharger